Hilda Deswarte (born 8 February 1907) was a Belgian fencer. She competed in the individual women's foil event at the 1928 Summer Olympics.

References

External links
 

1907 births
Year of death missing
Belgian female foil fencers
Olympic fencers of Belgium
Fencers at the 1928 Summer Olympics